Cooloola Christian College (CCC) is a K-12 Christian school in Gympie, Queensland. The school is structured to offer education from 2½ years, in the newly developed Early Learning Centre, through to year 12. This school is set on award-winning grounds on the south side of the Gympie region, and has around 403 pupils.

External links
Cooloola Christian College Official website
CCC Early Learning Centre Official website
CCC Solomon Islands Ministry Official website
Solid Grounds Cafe at CCC Official website

High schools in Queensland
Nondenominational Christian schools in Queensland
Schools in Wide Bay–Burnett
Educational institutions established in 1992
1992 establishments in Australia